Ionidae or Ionidai was a deme in ancient Attica, of the phyle of Aegeis, sending two delegates to the Athenian Boule.

This deme, along with that of Cydantidae, venerated the kolokratai; these two demoi were the only ones, as far as we know, to venerate deities together.

Its site is tentatively located near Draphi.

References

Populated places in ancient Attica
Former populated places in Greece
Demoi